Coalsack Bluff is a small rock bluff standing at the northern limits of Walcott Neve,  west-southwest of Bauhs Nunatak. It was so named by the New Zealand Geological Survey Antarctic Expedition (1961–62) because of the coal seams found running through the bluff.

See also 
 Dirtbag Nunatak
 Masquerade Ridge

References 

Cliffs of the Ross Dependency
Shackleton Coast